John Hammond may refer to:

Arts and entertainment
John Hammond (record producer) (1910–1987), American record producer
John P. Hammond (born 1942), American blues guitarist, son of the record producer
John A. Hammond (1843–1939), Canadian painter
John Hammond (actor), lead actor in The Blue and the Gray miniseries (1982)
John Hammond, film character in 31 North 62 East
Dr. John Hammond, a fictional character in the Jurassic Park series

Politics
John Hannam (died 1559), aka John Hammond
John Hammond (died 1589) (1542–1589), MP for Rye and West Looe
John Hammond (Irish politician) (1842–1907), British politician for Carlow County
John Hammond (Wisconsin politician) (1814–?), Wisconsin farmer and legislator
John Hammond (U.S. Representative) (1827–1889), New York manufacturer and politician

Sports
John Hammond (bobsleigh) (born 1933), British Olympic bobsledder
John Hammond (cricketer) (1769–1844), English cricketer 
Johnny Hammond (rugby union) (1860–1907), British rugby
John Hammond (Canadian football) (1923–?), Canadian Football League player
John S. Hammond (fl. 1930s), American sport administrator
John Hammond (basketball) (born 1954), American sport business manager
John Hammond (racehorse trainer) (born 1960), British horse trainer

Other
John Hays Hammond (1855–1936), American mining engineer
SS John H. Hammond, a Liberty ship 
John Hays Hammond Jr. (1888–1965), American electrical engineer
John Hammond (physiologist) (1889–1964), British physiologist
John Hammond (weather forecaster) (born 1966), weather forecaster for the BBC
John Lawrence Hammond (1872–1949), English historical writer
John Brown Hammond (1856–1938), American activist
John C. Hammond (1842–1926), lawyer in the Commonwealth of Massachusetts
John Hammond (priest), Church of England archdeacon

See also
Jack Hammond (1891–1942), American baseball player
Jack Hammond (footballer) (1884–1971), Australian rules footballer
Jay Hammond (1922–2005), governor of Alaska 1974–1982
Johnny Hammond (disambiguation)
John Hammond Jr. (disambiguation)